Stone High School may refer to:

Old Frankfort Stone High School, (closed 1974) in Franklin, Indiana
Stone High School (Florida), (closed) an all-black school in Melbourne, Florida
Thomas Stone High School, in Waldorf, Maryland
Stone High School (Mississippi) in Wiggins, Mississippi
Stone Memorial High School, in Crossville, Tennessee